Arif Örgüç, also known as Mehmet Arif Örgüç, Hacı Arif Örgüç (1876 in Constantinople (Istanbul) – April 1940 in Istanbul) was an officer of the Ottoman Army and the Turkish Army.

Medals and decorations
Order of the Medjidie
Gallipoli Star (Ottoman Empire)
Silver Medal of Liyakat
Silver Medal of Imtiyaz
Medal of Independence with Red Ribbon

See also
List of high-ranking commanders of the Turkish War of Independence

Sources

1876 births
1940 deaths
Military personnel from Istanbul
Ottoman Military Academy alumni
Ottoman Army officers
Ottoman military personnel of the Italo-Turkish War
Ottoman military personnel of the Balkan Wars
Ottoman military personnel of World War I
Turkish Army officers
Turkish military personnel of the Greco-Turkish War (1919–1922)
Sheikh Said rebellion
Burials at Turkish State Cemetery
Recipients of the Order of the Medjidie
Recipients of the Liakat Medal
Recipients of the Imtiyaz Medal
Recipients of the Medal of Independence with Red Ribbon (Turkey)